Renardo Sidney, Jr. (born December 6, 1989) is an American professional basketball player. An All-American in high school, he played college basketball for the Mississippi State Bulldogs from 2009 to 2012.

High school
In Sidney's sophomore year of high school at Artesia High School, he averaged 18.6 points and 9.0 rebounds per game, earning All-State honors, and leading his team to the State Division 3 championship. After his sophomore season at Arestia High School, Sidney transferred to Fairfax High School. As a junior at Fairfax High School, Sidney averaged 24.0 points and 13.3 rebounds per game and was an all-state selection. In his senior season, Sidney averaged 26.5 points and 13.5 rebounds per game. He was also an all-state selection and was named a McDonald's and Parade All-American.

College career
Sidney missed his entire freshman season at Mississippi State due to an NCAA suspension. After sitting out the first nine games of his sophomore season due to a suspension, Sidney appeared in nineteen games and started eighteen. He averaged 14.2 points and 7.6 rebounds per game. In Sidney's junior season, he averaged 9.7 points and 5.2 rebounds per game. Following his junior season at Mississippi State, Sidney declared for the 2012 NBA Draft, but went undrafted.

Professional career
On November 7, 2012, Sidney joined the Los Angeles D-Fenders of the NBA D-League.

On December 13, 2013, Sidney signed with Guaros de Lara in Venezuela.

On January 10, 2016, Sidney was selected as the number one overall pick to the Compton Airmen in the inaugural draft of the California Basketball Association.

References

External links
Profile at Eurobasket.com

1989 births
Living people
African-American basketball players
American expatriate basketball people in Canada
American men's basketball players
Basketball players from Jackson, Mississippi
Centers (basketball)
Island Storm players
Mississippi State Bulldogs men's basketball players
Power forwards (basketball)
21st-century African-American sportspeople
20th-century African-American people